Hanoi University (HANU) (formerly Hanoi University of Foreign Studies), established in 1959 in Hanoi, is an institution for foreign language training and research.

Hanoi University offers bachelor's degrees in 10 languages including English, Chinese, Japanese, Korean, Russian, French, German, Spanish, Italian and Portuguese.
 
Among these, Masters and PhDs are offered in Russian, English, French and Chinese. Foreign languages offered as second languages are Bulgarian, Hungarian, Polish, Czech, Slovak, Romanian and Thai.

Since 2002, the university has offered Business Bachelor Programs taught in English, in business management, tourism management, international studies, computer science, finance-banking, marketing and accounting.

Foreign students make up 10% of the student population, enrolled for business or Vietnamese studies.

History
The former name of Hanoi University is Hanoi University of Foreign Studies, which is different from University of Languages and International Studies (directly under the management of Vietnam National University, Hanoi).

President Board 
 President: Assoc. Prof. Dr. Nguyen Van Trao.

Notable alumni 
Kaysone Phomvihane
Vương Đình Huệ
Đặng Phong
Trần Văn Lắm
Ninh Viết Giao

References

External links
 Hanoi University
 HANU International Office

Universities in Hanoi